Rahman Soyudoğru (born 6 January 1989) is a German professional footballer who plays as a striker for FV Ravensburg.

Career
Soyudoğru has played club football in Germany, Turkey and Austria for SC Freiburg II, Sivasspor, Göztepe and Rheindorf Altach.

Personal life
He is a cousin of Turkish international footballer Ömer Toprak.

References

External links
 
 

1989 births
Living people
German people of Turkish descent
German footballers
Association football forwards
Germany youth international footballers
Regionalliga players
Süper Lig players
2. Liga (Austria) players
SC Freiburg players
Sivasspor footballers
FV Ravensburg players
German expatriate footballers
German expatriate sportspeople in Austria
Expatriate footballers in Austria
People from Ravensburg
Sportspeople from Tübingen (region)
Footballers from Baden-Württemberg